The Xi Jinping–Li Keqiang Administration of the People's Republic of China began in 2013, when Xi Jinping and Li Keqiang succeeded Hu Jintao and Wen Jiabao following the 18th National Congress of the Chinese Communist Party. It is speculated that Xi will solidify the political power of the CCP general secretary, for the absolute command of the Communist ideology over pragmatic approach, and on the economic front there will be no liberalization but socialist entrenchment.

Along with Xi, who replaced Hu Jintao as CCP general secretary and president, and Li, who replaced Wen Jiabao as premier, the fifth generation of CCP leadership includes Zhang Dejiang, Yu Zhengsheng, Liu Yunshan, Wang Qishan, Zhang Gaoli, Li Yuanchao, Liu Yandong and Wang Yang.

The Xi–Li Administration ended following the end of Li Keqiang's term on 11 March 2023. He was replaced with Li Qiang.

Functions and powers

Politburo Standing Committee

Presidency

National People's Congress and Chinese People's Political Consultative Conference leaders

The State Council

History 
Xi Jinping was elected Vice Chairman of the CCP Central Military Commission at the fifth Central Committee Election of 17th National Congress of the Chinese Communist Party. Li Keqiang is currently the party secretary of the State Council and the deputy leader of the Leading Group for Financial and Economic Affairs.

Following the 18th National Congress, Xi was named General Secretary of the CCP and Chairman of the Central Military Commission.

See also 

 Generations of Chinese leadership
 Li Keqiang Government
 Anti-corruption campaign under Xi Jinping

References 

Government of China
21st century in China
Xi Jinping
Li Keqiang